The Peace and Development Party (PDP) was a political party in Somalia. It was established in April 2011 by Hassan Sheikh Mohamud, the President of Somalia from 2012 to 2017. PDP members unanimously elected him as the party's Chairman in April 2011, with a mandate to serve as leader for the next three years. The party's leadership also has ties with Al-Islah, Somalia's branch of the Muslim Brotherhood.

In October 2019, the PDP joined the Forum for National Parties, an alliance of Somali political parties which have agreed to work together to resolve Somalia's political and security issues.

References

See also
Political parties in Somalia

Political parties in Somalia
Islamic political parties in Somalia
Islamic democratic political parties
Muslim Brotherhood
2011 establishments in Somalia
Political parties established in 2011
Political parties disestablished in 2018